The Albert S. Potter Octagon House (also known simply as the Octagon House) is an historic octagonal house located at 4 Carolina Main Street (Rhode Island Route 112) on the corner of Shannock Hill Road in the village of Carolina in Richmond, Rhode Island. It was built by watchmaker Albert S. Potter in 1857. Potter reportedly did his watchmaking in the octagonal cupola atop the two-story house. The building is now covered with asbestos siding and is owned by the Carolina Preservation and Band Society.

The Albert S. Potter Octagon House is a contributing property in the Carolina Village Historic District, which was added to the National Register of Historic Places on May 2, 1974.

References

External link
Richmond: Albert S. Potter Octagonal House, at Rhode Island College digital commons

Houses completed in 1857
Houses in Washington County, Rhode Island
Octagon houses in the United States
Richmond, Rhode Island
Historic district contributing properties in Rhode Island
National Register of Historic Places in Washington County, Rhode Island
Houses on the National Register of Historic Places in Rhode Island
1857 establishments in Rhode Island